Abhishek Sharma (born 4 September 2000) is an Indian cricketer. He made his List A debut for Punjab in the 2016–17 Vijay Hazare Trophy on 25 February 2017. He made his first-class debut for Punjab in the 2017–18 Ranji Trophy on 6 October 2017.

In December 2017, he was named in India's squad for the 2018 Under-19 Cricket World Cup which was held in New Zealand. In January 2018, he was bought by the Delhi Daredevils in the 2018 IPL auction for Rs 5.5 million. On 12 May 2018, he made his Twenty20 debut, playing for the Delhi Daredevils in the 2018 Indian Premier League and went on to score 46 runs off just 19 balls. On 28 February 2021 playing for Punjab against Madhya Pradesh, he scored the fastest hundred by an Indian in List-A cricket, in 42 balls. In February 2022, he was bought by the Sunrisers Hyderabad in the auction for the 2022 Indian Premier League tournament.

References

External links
 

2000 births
Living people
Indian cricketers
Delhi Capitals cricketers
Punjab, India cricketers
Cricketers from Amritsar
Sunrisers Hyderabad cricketers